Karapınar is a village in the Karakoçan District of Elazığ Province in Turkey. Its population is 259 (2021). The village is populated by Kurds.

References

Villages in Karakoçan District
Kurdish settlements in Elazığ Province